We the Living and similar titles can refer to:

 We the Living, a novel by Ayn Rand (1936)
 We the Living (film), an Italian film, based on the novel by Ayn Rand, directed by Goffredo Alessandrini (1942)
 We Are the Living, a collection of short stories by Erskine Caldwell (1933)
 For Us, The Living: A Comedy of Customs, a novel by Robert Heinlein (written 1938, published only in 2003)
 For Us the Living: The Medgar Evers Story, a made-for-television biographical film (1986)
 We the Living (band), a United States alternative rock group 
 You, the Living, a film directed by Roy Andersson (2007)

See also

 We Are the Dead (disambiguation)